Gordon Kerr may refer to:

Gordon Kerr (British Army officer) (born c. 1948)
Gordon Kerr (footballer), Scottish footballer
Gordon Kerr (swimmer) (1917–2009), Canadian backstroke swimmer